Mikel Campos is a Filipino actor.

Career 

Campos made his acting debut, in 2002, when he joined the teen drama Click

The following year, he appeared in the films Filipinas and Captain Barbell.

In 2004; Campos was cast as one of the three leading men in Sarah the Teen Princess, after the abrupt withdrawal of Viva Artists Agency's talent pool from GMA Network.

Campos played the miserly Mike in the teen sitcom Let's Go! from 2005 to 2007.

In 2009, Campos appeared in adult comedy Maximus & Minimus and was awarded Best Actor in the Cinema One Originals Film Festival.

Personal life 

Campos is one of two sons of Susan Gaddi-Campos, a former ramp and commercial model, and business man Bunny Campos. He has an older brother named Richard.

He has a daughter Aera, born 2013, with Louise Arielle Guittap.

Filmography

Television

Film

Theater

Awards and nominations

References

External links 
 

Living people
Filipino male film actors
Place of birth missing (living people)
Filipino male stage actors
1986 births